This is a list of members of the Western Australian Legislative Council from 22 May 1908 to 21 May 1910. The chamber had 30 seats made up of ten provinces each electing three members, on a system of rotation whereby one-third of the members would retire at each biennial election.

Notes
 On 7 September 1909, South-East MLC Wesley Maley resigned. Joseph Cullen won the resulting by-election on 1 October 1907.
 On 8 December 1909, North Province MLC Robert Frederick Sholl died. Edward Wittenoom was returned unopposed on 8 January 1910.

Sources
 
 

Members of Western Australian parliaments by term